Industrial is the debut album by the band Pitchshifter. It was released in 1991 on Peaceville Records. It is the only Pitchshifter album featuring Mark Clayden on lead vocals. After Industrial was released, the band released a single "Death Industrial" with two new tracks that would later be released on Submit.

Background 
According to bassist and singer Mark Clayden the band "made the first album for £500 in a week in a shithole studio in Leeds." The album cover is a shot of Frank Booth's death in the film Blue Velvet. The deluxe edition of the album The Industrialist by American industrial metal band Fear Factory contains a cover of "Landfill".

Track listing

Personnel

Pitchshifter
 Mark Clayden – bass, lead vocals
 Stu E. Toolin – rhythm guitar
 Johnny A. Carter – lead guitar, keyboard and drum machine programming
 J.S. Clayden – backing vocals

Technical personnel
 Paul Sludgefeast – artwork
 Mick A. – artwork
 Guy Hatton – engineering
 Nimbus – mastering
 Cath – Photography

References

Pitchshifter albums
1991 debut albums
Peaceville Records albums